Paperhouse Records was a British independent record label which operated from 1990 to 1993.

The label was a short-lived joint venture by Glass Records owner David E. Barker and Fire Records owner Clive Solomon. It is named after "Paperhouse", opening track on Tago Mago, the 1971 album by Krautrock band Can.

Paperhouse issued Richard Hell's Dim Stars material, and records by Teenage Fanclub and other bands connected with Creation Records (The Pastels, The Servants). The label also issued material by the Kurt Cobain-championed Daniel Johnston.

Paperhouse Records discography
Albums may be in LP (PAPLP), compact disc (PAPCD), or cassette (PAPMC) format, with singles listed with variations on the PAPER prefix. Artefacts with the same title under different catalogue entries refer to the same recording, if releases were not always issued in more than one format, leading to apparent gaps in the series.

See also
 List of record labels
 List of independent UK record labels

References

British record labels
Record labels based in London